Austra is an island on the border between Trøndelag and Nordland counties in Norway. The  island is shared between the municipalities of Bindal, Leka, and Nærøysund. The highest point is the  Romsskåla. The village of Årset lies on the southeastern shore, along the Årsetfjorden. The village of Bogen lies on the east coast of the island where the bridge connects it to the mainland. The village of Horsfjord lies on the northern coast. The village of Gutvik lies on the western coast

See also
List of islands of Norway

References

Islands of Nordland
Islands of Trøndelag
Nærøysund
Nærøy
Leka, Norway
Bindal